Martin Brochu (born March 10, 1973) is a Canadian retired professional ice hockey goaltender who played briefly in the National Hockey League with the Washington Capitals, Vancouver Canucks, and Pittsburgh Penguins. He went winless in his nine-game NHL career.

As a youth, Brochu played in the 1985 Quebec International Pee-Wee Hockey Tournament with a minor ice hockey team from Pointe-aux-Trembles.

Career statistics

Regular season and playoffs

Transactions
September 22, 1992: Signed as a free agent by Montreal.
March 15, 1996: Traded to Washington by Montreal for future considerations.
August 25, 2000: Signed as a free agent by Calgary.
July 17, 2001: Signed as a free agent by Minnesota.
September 28, 2001: Claimed by Vancouver from Minnesota in Waiver Draft.
October 22, 2002: Signed as a free agent by Verdun (QSPHL).
August 22, 2003: Signed as a free agent by Pittsburgh.

References

External links

1973 births
Living people
Canadian ice hockey goaltenders
Fredericton Canadiens players
Granby Bisons players
Hull Olympiques players
Ice hockey people from Montreal
Manitoba Moose players
People from Anjou, Quebec
Pittsburgh Penguins players
Portland Pirates players
Saint John Flames players
Severstal Cherepovets players
Undrafted National Hockey League players
Vancouver Canucks players
Washington Capitals players
Wheeling Nailers players
Wheeling Thunderbirds players
Wilkes-Barre/Scranton Penguins players
Utah Grizzlies (IHL) players
Canadian expatriate ice hockey players in Russia
Canadian expatriate ice hockey players in the United States